Imperial Noble Consort Gongshun (恭順皇貴妃) of the Manchu Bordered Yellow Banner Niohuru clan (鈕祜祿氏) was a consort of the Jiaqing Emperor. She was 27 years his junior.

Life

Family background
Imperial Noble Consort Gongshun's personal name was not recorded in history.

 Father: Shanqing, served as a sixth rank literary official
 Mother: Lady Yang

Qianlong era
The future Imperial Noble Consort Gongshun was born on the 12th day of the fourth lunar month in the 52nd year of the reign of the Qianlong Emperor, which translates to 28 May 1787 in the Gregorian calendar.

Jiaqing era
In 1801, Lady Niohuru entered the Forbidden City and was granted the title "Noble Lady Ru" by the Jiaqing Emperor. On 8 March 1805, she gave birth to his eighth daughter, who would die prematurely in December 1805 or January 1806.

Lady Niohuru was elevated in May or June 1805 to "Concubine Ru", and on 18 October 1810 to "Consort Ru". She gave birth on 18 February 1811 to the emperor's ninth daughter, Princess Huimin of the First Rank, who would die prematurely in June or July 1815, and on 8 March 1814 to his fifth son, Mianyu.

Daoguang era
The Jiaqing Emperor died on 2 September 1820 and was succeeded by his second son Minning, who was enthroned as the Daoguang Emperor. In January or February 1821, the Daoguang Emperor elevated Lady Niohuru to "Dowager Noble Consort Ru" and let her reside in Shou'an Palace (壽安宮). In 1846, she was elevated to "Dowager Imperial Noble Consort Ru".

Xianfeng era
The Daoguang Emperor died on 26 February 1850 and was succeeded by his fourth son Yizhu, who was enthroned as the Xianfeng Emperor. Lady Niohuru became "Grand Dowager Imperial Noble Consort Ru". She died on 23 April 1860 and was granted the posthumous title "Imperial Noble Consort Gongshun". She was interred in the Chang Mausoleum of the Western Qing tombs.

Titles
 During the reign of the Qianlong Emperor (r. 1735–1796):
 Lady Niohuru (from 28 May 1787)
 During the reign of the Jiaqing Emperor (r. 1796–1820):
 Noble Lady Ru (from 1801), sixth rank consort
 Concubine Ru (from May/June 1805), fifth rank consort
 Consort Ru (from 18 October 1810), fourth rank consort
 During the reign of the Daoguang Emperor (r. 1820–1850):
 Dowager Noble Consort Ru (from January/February 1821), third rank consort
 Dowager Imperial Noble Consort Ru (from 1846), second rank consort
 During the reign of the Xianfeng Emperor (r. 1850–1861):
 Imperial Noble Consort Gongshun (from 10 July 1860)

Issue
 As Noble Lady Ru:
 The Jiaqing Emperor's eighth daughter (8 March 1805 – 14 January 1806)
 As Consort Ru:
 Princess Huimin of the First Rank (18 February 1811 – 28 June 1815), the Jiaqing Emperor's ninth daughter
 Mianyu (8 March 1814 – 9 January 1865), the Jiaqing Emperor's fifth son, granted the title Prince Hui of the Second Rank in 1820, elevated to Prince Hui of the First Rank in 1839, posthumously honoured as Prince Huiduan of the First Rank

In fiction and popular culture
 Portrayed by Sheren Tang in War and Beauty (2004) and Beauty at War (2013)
 Portrayed by Katherine Ho in Succession War (2018)

See also
 Ranks of imperial consorts in China#Qing
 Royal and noble ranks of the Qing dynasty

Notes

References
 

1787 births
1860 deaths
Consorts of the Jiaqing Emperor
Manchu people